The Wollaston Peninsula (previously, Wollaston Land) is a west-pointing peninsula located on southwestern Victoria Island, Canada. It is bordered by Prince Albert Sound to the north, Amundsen Gulf to the west and Dolphin and Union Strait to the south. Most of the peninsula lies in Nunavut's Kitikmeot Region but a smaller portion lies within the Northwest Territories's Inuvik Region. Its westernmost point is Cape Baring.
In 1826, its south coast was seen by John Richardson and his surveyor Edward Nicholas Kendall, and was named Wollaston Land, in honour of the English chemist William Hyde Wollaston, who discovered the elements palladium and rhodium. In 1851, John Rae went along most of its coast and proved that "Wollaston Land" was connected to that was called "Victoria Land" to the east.

References

Peninsulas of the Northwest Territories
Peninsulas of Kitikmeot Region
Victoria Island (Canada)
Geography of the Inuvialuit Settlement Region